R.A.N. Public School is a co-educational and senior  secondary school, located at Rudrapur (near Nainital), India.

Description
R.A.N. Public School was founded in the fond memory of Late Sri Amarnath Rai by Wing Commander H.K. Rai.

References

High schools and secondary schools in Uttarakhand
Education in Udham Singh Nagar district
Educational institutions established in 1992
1992 establishments in Uttar Pradesh